This is a list of lighthouses in Suriname.

Lighthouses

(*) Lightship coordinates after decommissioned

See also
 Lists of lighthouses and lightvessels

References

External links
 

Lighthouses in Suriname
Suriname
lighthouses of Suriname
Lighthouses